Rafael Frontaura (7 February 1896 in Valparaiso – 15 August 1966 in Santiago) was a Chilean actor who worked in both Chilean and Argentine cinema. He appeared in El hombre de acero (1917), Little Teacher of Workmen (1941) and Rigoberto (1945), and he also starred in the acclaimed Silver Condor-winning 1943 film Juvenilia.

Filmography
 El hombre de acero (also wrote)
 Los payasos se van (1921)
 Our Land of Peace (1939)
 Ambición (1939)
 La quinta calumnia (1941)
 Napoleón (1941)
 Volver a vivir (1941)
 Historia de una noche (1941)
 Sensational Kidnapping (1942) – Carlos Suárez
 La maestrita de los obreros (1942)
 Yo conocí a esa mujer (1942)
 Concierto de almas (1942)
 En el viejo Buenos Aires (1942)
 El espejo (1943)
 Casi un sueño (1943)
 Juvenilia (1943)
 La juventud manda (1943)
 Stella (1943)
 Cuando florezca el naranjo (1943)
 Hay que casar a Paulina (1944)
 Apasionadamente (1944)
 Camino del infierno (1945) – Carlos
 Rigoberto (1945)
 Rosa de América (1946)
 Rodríguez supernumerario (1948)
 La gran tentación (1948)
 Ángeles de uniforme (Inédita) (1949)
 Fascinación (1949)
 Toscanito y los detectives (1950) – Linares
 Cuando un pobre se divierte (1951)
 El extraño caso del hombre y la bestia (1951) – Actor
 Reportaje en el infierno (1951)
 My Divine Poverty (1951)

References

External links
 

Chilean male film actors
1896 births
1966 deaths
People from Valparaíso